Sansern Limwattana (born June 30, 1997) is a Thai professional footballer who plays as a midfielder for Chiangmai United in the Thai League 2..

Personal life
Sansern has a brother Baramee Limwattana is also a footballer and plays for Buriram United as a Midfield.

Clubs 

Youth

Senior

International career

He won the 2015 AFF U-19 Youth Championship with Thailand U19.

International goals

Under-23

Under-19

Honours

International
Thailand U-19
 AFF U-19 Youth Championship : 2015

References

External links

1997 births
Living people
Sansern Limwattana
Sansern Limwattana
Association football midfielders
Waitakere United players
Sansern Limwattana
Sansern Limwattana
Sansern Limwattana
Sansern Limwattana
New Zealand Football Championship players
Sansern Limwattana
Sansern Limwattana
Thai expatriate footballers
Thai expatriate sportspeople in New Zealand
Expatriate association footballers in New Zealand
Footballers at the 2018 Asian Games
Sansern Limwattana